The Royal Academy of Medicine in Ireland (RAMI) is a learned medical society in Dublin, Ireland.

History
RAMI was established in 1882 by the amalgamation of the Dublin Society of Surgeons, the Medical Society of the Royal College of Physicians of Ireland, the Pathological Society and the Dublin Obstetrical Society. Its first president was John Thomas Banks. Other former presidents include James Little and Charles Bent Ball. Victoria Coffey was a former president of the RAMI paediatrics section.

The Irish Journal of Medical Science is the official journal of RAMI.

Notable Fellows
 Dermot P. Kelleher
 David Drummond

References

Medical associations based in Ireland